The 1894 United Counties League was a competition between West Midland, East Midland and Sheffield Clubs.It was won by Derby County.

Format
The competition was organised as two separate leagues with the winner of each league playing each other in a final to determine the overall winner.

Group A contained four teams, Small Heath, Stoke, West Bromwich Albion and Wolverhampton Wanderers.

Group B contained five teams, Derby County, Nottingham Forest, Notts County, Sheffield United and Sheffield Wednesday.

1894 Competition

Group A

Table

Results

Group B

Table

Results

Final

Charlie Perry is credited in some reports as scoring for West Bromwich Albion in the first match.

References

United Counties League (1890s)